D.555 is a north to south state road running on the European part of Turkey. It starts in Dereköy Checkpoint at the Bulgaria-Turkey border crossing and ends in Tekirdağ at the  junction. It is part of the European route E87 between its starting point and the D.100 junction in Babaeski.

Itinerary 
{| class="wikitable"
!rowspan="2" |Province
!rowspan="2" |Location
!colspan="3" |Distance from (km)
|-
!previous location
!Dereköy CP
!Tekirdağ
|-
|rowspan="5" style="text-align:left;" |Kırklareli 
|Dereköy Checkpoint ||0 ||0 ||156
|-
|Dereköy ||12 ||12 ||144
|-
|Pınarhisar ||29 ||41 ||115
|-
|Karacaoğlan ||24 ||65 ||91
|-
|Babaeski ||10 ||75 ||81
|-
|rowspan="3" style="text-align:left;" |Tekirdağ 
|Hayrabolu ||32 ||107 ||49
|-
|Banarlı ||30 ||137 ||19
|-
|Tekirdağ ||19 ||156 ||0

Intersections
 in Pınarhisar 
 in Babaeski
 in Tekirdağ

References

External links

555
Transport in Kırklareli Province
Transport in Tekirdağ Province